Rocksmith 2014 is a music video game produced by Ubisoft. It is a followup to the 2011 game Rocksmith, but has been described as a replacement to the original game rather than a sequel. Like its predecessor, the game allows players to plug in virtually any electric guitar or bass guitar and play along via the use of a USB adapter – removing the need for any proprietary controller like other music games such as Guitar Hero. The game comes with 66 songs on disk, with over a thousand more available to download as paid DLC. It was announced at Ubisoft's 2013 E3 presentation and was released for PlayStation 3, Xbox 360 and PC/Mac in October 2013, with versions for PlayStation 4 and Xbox One releasing in November 2014.

Rocksmith 2014 was released to generally positive reviews from critics who praised the game's improvements over its predecessor. The game continued to receive new DLC song packs weekly until March 2020. The game was succeeded by Rocksmith+, a music education-based subscription service based on the previous Rocksmith games, which was released on September 6, 2022.

Gameplay

Rocksmith 2014 recommends the use of the "Hercules" adapter, a USB cable that connects to the standard  in (6.35 mm) output jack of most electric and bass guitars. Other guitars, such as acoustic guitars, may require additional hardware, such as a pickup.

Rocksmith 2014 offers three different development paths for lead, rhythm, and bass guitar respectively. It now includes the ability to set song difficulty, rather than having to play the song starting at the lowest difficulty, as in Rocksmith. The game includes a Session Mode, which enables players to perform in jam sessions with the in-game musicians. Other new modes include an enhanced Master Mode to help with memory-playing and new Guitarcade minigames. New missions have been added as a way to challenge and direct players towards areas they need to improve upon.

Rocksmith 2014 is intended to be more of a teaching tool than the original game, featuring more than 85 lessons covering bends, accents, slides, and more. A new finger positioning tool has also been added. Rocksmith 2014 also features a mode for colorblind players.

Development
On why the publisher chose the name Rocksmith 2014 as opposed to Rocksmith 2, senior vice president of sales and marketing Tony Key explained it was to encourage those who had not played the first game yet to buy and play the second one, without needing to invest in a previous installment of the franchise. He compared it to foreign language learning courses: "This is not the second step in guitar playing. Some people might interpret it that way. If you see Spanish 1 and then Spanish 2, you think that you need to learn Spanish 1 first." He described Rocksmith 2014 as a "replacement" for the original game rather than a sequel, and argued that its new songs, modes and improvements justified the purchase for people who had already bought the original Rocksmith.

Rocksmith 2014 Edition — Remastered
On 26 August 2016, Ubisoft announced Rocksmith 2014 Edition — Remastered, an updated version of the game to be released on 4 October 2016. The new version includes "a customizable learning curve, expanded practice tools, stat tracking, improved menus and more". The Remastered version is a free update to existing versions of the game, but was also released at retail for PC, PlayStation 4, and Xbox One with six additional songs. These six bonus songs have been released as DLC for all other users.

On 13 December 2016, Ubisoft released an additional patch for Rocksmith 2014 Edition — Remastered, which added two new capabilities that removed the requirement for the Real-Tone Cable. The first capability added to the software was Microphone Mode, which allowed players to use USB microphones and input devices that could simulate microphones for both players of acoustic guitars, and electric guitar players using non-Real-Tone cables. While this mode allows for note detection with the software, it disables the Rocksmith 2014's Authentic Tone capabilities, and players are limited to the "clean" guitar sound captured by the software. The second capability added to the software allows players to play along with the note tracks without note detection enabled.

In April 2020, it was announced that Rocksmith 2014 would receive no further DLC after the Opeth song pack, as focus was shifting to a new project.

Track list
The game initially contains 66 playable tracks with over a thousand more available as DLC. "Cherub Rock" by the Smashing Pumpkins was a free DLC giveaway with pre-orders of the game. Rocksmith 2014 is capable of importing most songs from the original Rocksmith, with a few exceptions due to licensing issues.

Downloadable content

All Rocksmith DLC songs are forward-compatible with Rocksmith 2014, but DLC songs released on or after 22 October 2013 are compatible only with Rocksmith 2014 and will not play on the original version of Rocksmith. As of 3 January 2017, there are 835 songs and 209 song packs available to download from the Rocksmith store. Ubisoft San Francisco announced in April 2020 that they would be stopping development of further DLC for Rocksmith 2014 as they transitioned to a new project, after delivering 383 weeks of DLC content.

In addition to the DLC for Rocksmith 2014, owners of the original Rocksmith are able to purchase a Disc Import Tool that will import 52 of the 57 songs available on the original Rocksmith. The tracks that do not carry over are:

Reception

Rocksmith 2014 was released in the US on October 22, 2013, to mostly positive reviews. Aggregating review website Metacritic rated the PC version 89/100, the PlayStation 3 version 86/100, and the Xbox 360 version 87/100.

Lee Cooper of Hardcore Gamer praised the game and its general improvement over 2011's Rocksmith, saying, "Every facet of gameplay has been given a nice thick coat of improvement in Rocksmith 2014, issues that the original title was known for have either been removed entirely, or overhauled beyond recognition."

References

External links

Steampowered

2013 video games
Gamebryo games
Guitar video games
MacOS games
Music video games
PlayStation 3 games
PlayStation 4 games
Ubisoft games
Video games developed in the United States
Windows games
Xbox 360 games
Xbox One games